The Château de Bordères-Louron is a ruined castle in the commune of Bordères-Louron in the Hautes-Pyrénées département of France.

History
The castle was built in the third quarter of the 13th century. It belonged to the family of Roger d'Espagne (Roger of Spain) from the 14th century. In 1740, a fire destroyed much of the village and the castle. Remains of the castle's enceinte are still visible.

The castle ruins are privately owned.

See also
List of castles in France

References

External links
 

Buildings and structures in Hautes-Pyrénées
Castles in Hautes-Pyrénées